Ysby is a locality situated in Laholm Municipality, Halland County, Sweden, with 260 inhabitants in 2010.

References 

Populated places in Laholm Municipality